Qiaoziwan Township is an rural township in Sangzhi County, Zhangjiajie, Hunan Province, China.

Administrative division
The township is divided into 17 villages, the following areas: Yanta Village, Daxikou Village, Baixing Village, Songbai Village, Changping Village, Zhangjiaqiao Village, Ya'erchi Village, Dengjiaping Village, Liujiapu Village, Zhongjiatai Village, Zhujiapo Village, Shanyangxi Village, Wuziwan Village, Panjiashan Village, Baiyang Village, Lijiaya Village, and Wangjia Village (岩塔村、大溪口村、白星村、松柏村、长坪村、张家桥村、鸭儿池村、邓家坪村、刘家铺村、钟家台村、祝家坡村、山羊溪村、五子湾村、潘家山村、白杨村、李家亚村、王家村).

References

External links

Divisions of Sangzhi County